The Couronne was an 80-gun Saint-Esprit-class ship of the line of the French Navy.

She was laid down at Brest in August 1766 and launched in May 1768. She took part in the Battle of Ushant in 1778 and the Battle of Martinique under Guichen in July 1780. She was burnt by accident at Brest in April 1781, with some of her salvaged hull probably being used in her successor, also named Couronne.

Ships of the line of the French Navy
1768 ships
Ships built in France
Maritime incidents in 1781
Ship fires